Quadratapora is a genus of lobopodian known only from its biomineralized dorsal plates, which somewhat resemble those of Microdictyon.  Its fossils date to the Tommotian, representing (perhaps along with Rhombocorniculum) the earliest record of lobopodians.

References

Cambrian animals
Lobopodia
Prehistoric protostome genera